Silk painting refers to paintings on silk. They are a traditional way of painting in Asia. Methods vary, but using traditional supplies of 100% silk fabric, stretched in a frame, and  applying textile paints or dyes are the beginnings of an amazing  creative  process in making textile art and the process

National styles

China
One of the earliest surviving Chinese silk paintings is a 2-metre long T-shaped painting, dated from around 165 BCE, from the Mawangdui. However, painting on silk quickly gave way to painting on other supports.

Silk painting employs gutta as a resist, allowing fine patterns to be achieved.

The Tibetan Thangka is the best known religious painting.

Vietnam

Ancient period

Silk painting (Tranh lụa) was a traditional artisanry in Vietnam. There have been some old silk paintings, e.g. portraits of Nguyễn Trãi, Phùng Khắc Khoan, Trịnh Đình Kiên, Phan Huy Cẩn, Phan Huy Ích, Phan Huy Thực, and Phan Huy Vịnh dated from Lê and Nguyễn dynasty.

Modern period
Silk paintings of the modern period in Vietnam were taken up by some of the students and French teachers at the EBAI in Hanoi during the 1930s. The earliest representative of the new interest in silk painting at a 1931 Paris exhibition of silk paintings was Nguyễn Phan Chánh, a student of EBAI who had originally trained in calligraphy, and who struggled with French oil techniques, and so whom the school director Victor Tardieu encouraged to use traditional media.

References

Painting techniques
Silk